John Ancel "Jack" Helms (January 28, 1922 in Charlotte, NC – May 20, 2002 in Columbia, SC) was an American football player in the National Football League. He played for the Detroit Lions. He played collegiately for the Georgia Tech Yellow Jackets.

References

1922 births
2002 deaths
Georgia Tech Yellow Jackets football players
Detroit Lions players